The Geographic Institute Agustín Codazzi (IGAC), is the entity of the Government of Colombia responsible for producing the official maps and basic cartography of Colombia, and managing the national cadastral infrastructure and the national soil survey. It is also charged with advancing geographic investigations for the development of the country, and educating and training professionals in the geographic information technologies. IGAC also distributes geographic data in the form of its online portal, SIGOT.

History
The institute was created following the Colombia–Peru War with the creation of the Military Institute of Geography (Instituto Geográfico Militar) on August 13, 1935, by means of the Decreto 1440 de 1935, and ascribed to the Ministry of War. On January 31, 1940, Decreto 153 de 1940 restructured the institute giving cadastral duties by fusing it with the National Section of Cadastre (Sección Nacional de Catastro), and transferred to the Ministry of Finance and Public Credit, renaming it the Military and Cadastral Geographical Institute (Instituto Geográfico Militar y Catastral). On November 8, 1957, by means of the Decreto Ley 0290 de 1957, the institute was renamed the Geographic Institute Agustín Codazzi in memory of the cartographer Agostino Codazzi and in commemoration of the centenary of his Chorographic Commission, a monumental endeavour that sought to create a geographic land survey of the Neogranadine territory, similar in its goals to the Lewis and Clark Expedition in the United States. The IGAC then became a decentralized agency under the executive branch until 1999 when it was ascribed to the National Administrative Department of Statistics (DANE) by Decreto 1174 de 1999.

See also
(List of) national mapping agencies

References

Government agencies established in 1935
Government agencies of Colombia
National mapping agencies
Geography of Colombia
National Administrative Department of Statistics
1935 establishments in Colombia